Islamic Foundation North is a mosque located in Waukegan, Illinois. Its current building was built in 2004. The organization itself has existed since 1977 when it was established to serve the needs of the Muslim community of Chicago's northern suburbs. It is not affiliated with Islamic Foundation in Villa Park, Illinois.  The Imam and resident scholar of the mosque is Azfar Uddin.

See also
List of Mosques in Illinois
Islam in the United States
Timeline of Islamic history
Islamic Architecture
Islamic Art
  List of mosques in the Americas
  Lists of mosques 
  List of mosques in the United States

References

External links
 

Mosques completed in 2004
Mosques in Illinois
Waukegan, Illinois
Mosque buildings with domes